Bodrean and Frogmore are farmstead settlements in Cornwall, England, United Kingdom, situated two miles (3.5 kilometres) north-northeast of Truro.

The farm specialises in Aberdeen Angus cattle  and also provides holiday accommodation.

Frogmore is located at  where a lane crosses the Trevella Stream, a tributary of the Truro River, on a stone bridge.

See also

 List of farms in Cornwall

References

Hamlets in Cornwall
Farms in Cornwall